Hoengseong station is a railway station in Hoengseong-eup, Hoengseong, South Korea. It is served by the Gangneung Line. The station opened on 22 December 2017, ahead of the 2018 Winter Olympics.

References

External links

Railway stations in Gangwon Province, South Korea
Railway stations opened in 2017